Đỗ Sỹ Huy (born 16 April 1998) is a Vietnamese footballer who plays for Công An Nhân Dân as a goalkeeper.

Honours
Công An Nhân Dân
V.League 2: 2022

Individuals
 Best goalkeeper of Vietnamese National U-19 Football Championship: 2016

References

Living people
Vietnamese footballers
Association football goalkeepers
V.League 1 players
Hanoi FC players
1998 births